Neosergestes is a genus of prawns belonging to the family Sergestidae.

The species of this genus are found in the southern parts of the oceans.

Species:

Neosergestes brevispinatus 
Neosergestes consobrinus 
Neosergestes edwardsii 
Neosergestes orientalis 
Neosergestes semissis 
Neosergestes tantillus

References

Dendrobranchiata